Mikayel Abrahamyan (born December 24, 1984), known professionally as Misho, is an Armenian rapper and actor, best known as the pioneer of hip-hop music in Armenia.

Early life
Misho was born Mikayel Abrahamyan  on December 24, 1984 in Yerevan to a family of doctors and  teachers from the Republic of Artsakh. He played basketball during his late school and college years. In 2009, he graduated from the Yerevan State Medical University and received his medical license as a doctor.

Musical career
Misho became interested in rap music in his high school years. He had started writing poetry at the age of 14, so when he first listened to Hip Hop music, he was fascinated by how music and poetry could go together, and so he realized he wanted to do that himself. In 2000, with his childhood friends Yoj, Hamo, and his cousin Sash, Misho formed a group called "Selected from...." where he first experimented with creating Hip-Hop music in the Armenian language. They wrote songs both in Armenian and Russian. A year later, the group dissolved, without any apparent reason.

In 2001, Misho met HT Hayko, with whom two years later their first single came out called "Hay tghen tghaya" («Հայ տղեն տղայա») under the group name Hay Tgheq («Հայ Տղեք», Armenian Guys). This was the first Armenian Hip Hop group in Armenia. Hay Tgheq was formally dissolved in 2008, but by that time Misho had founded a new group called Hay Team («Հայ Թիմ», Armenian Team).

In 2007 Misho started his solo career with the release of his album, “Eka, Tesa, ...i” (Էկա, տեսա, ...ի). Misho established himself as a serious lyricist, bringing to light social injustices and taboos in his country. His body of work is unique not only in pioneering Hip-Hop music in Armenia, but also in his politically conscious lyrical content. Since then he’s released "Qaxaqe Xosuma, Lseq" (Քաղաքը խոսում ա, լսեք...) in 2009, "Inquam" with Garik in 2009, "Im Lezun" (Իմ Լեզուն) in 2011, "Mi Qani Hogi" (Մի Քանի Հոգի) group project in 2013, "Btsaxndir" (Բծախնդիր) in 2015, "Maraxux" (Մառախուղ) in 2017, "Mi Qani Hogi" 2 (Մի Քանի Հոգի 2) in 2018 and "Xchchvats Jur" (Խճճված Ջուր) which was released in 2020.

Acting career
Misho’s success in music lead to various movie offers. In 2005 he had his first movie role appearance in “Mer Bake 3”  for which he also did the soundtrack with Hay Tghek. In 2010 Misho was offered his first lead movie role in "A Millionaire Wanted.". After the success of this film he was offered 2 more leads in "Poker AM"  (2012) and "Four Buddies and the Bride" (2015). He has an upcoming Untitled Film by Sharm Holding  set to be released in 2018.

Campaigns
Misho’s popularity with his music and acting career combined also made him the face of various campaigns. In 2012 Misho’s image was used for the AIDS campaign, the purpose of which was to ask for blood donations for those affected by the virus.  Misho was also asked to hold a master workshop in Tumo Center for Creative Technologies  where he taught the children how to express themselves through the art of lyricism and rap.
In 2015 VivaCell-MTS made Misho the face of their campaigns, shot 4 commercials with him, and commissioned him to write a song that would also serve as the soundtrack for their campaign called "Super BIT."

Charity
After receiving his Medical License, although Misho followed his career path in music, he continued to volunteer as a medical doctor, treating children living in poverty, children in orphanages as well as disabled children. He also used his popularity as an artist to put on performances for various charity concerts such as a Blood Drive in 2013  in the city of Yerevan, a fundraiser for needy families of Armenian villages in Brussels, Belgium in 2015, and fundraising for sick children of Armenia in 2017.

Personal life
In 2012 Misho met television producer, host and actress, Sona Oganesyan, in Los Angeles, California, and they got married in Yerevan, Armenia in 2015.

Discography

Misho's albums since 2004.

Hay Tgheq albums
Hay Tgheq (Հայ Տղեք) (2004)
Mi Katil Meghr (Մի Կաթիլ Մեղր) (2006)

Solo albums
Eka, Tesa,...i (Էկա, տեսա, ...ի) (2007)
Qaxaq@ Xosuma, Lseq... (Քաղաքը խոսում ա, լսեք...) (2009)
Zero (Զրո) (2010)
Im Lezun (Իմ Լեզուն) (2011)
Btzaxndir (Բծախնդիր) (2015)
Maraxux (Մառախուղ) (2017)
Xchchvats Jur (Խճճված Ջուր) (2020)

Collaboration albums
Inquam (with Garik) (2009)
Mi Qani Hogi (Մի Քանի Հոգի) (as part of the group Mi Qani Hogi) (2013)
Mi Qani Hogi 2 (Մի Քանի Հոգի 2) (as a part of the group Mi Qani Hogi) (2018)

References

1984 births
Living people
Armenian rappers